Next Action Star is an American reality television program shown on NBC from June to July 2004.

Synopsis
The series featured 14 finalists (7 women and 7 men) vying for 2 spots as the Next Action Star in their own feature film.  Each week, the contestants participated in screen tests that determined who got a callback and who goes home. The two winners starred in their own made-for-TV movie, the Louis Morneau-directed Bet Your Life which was aired on NBC on August 4, 2004.

Contestants
The 14 contestants were:

Female
 Corinne Van Ryck de Groot (winner)
 Jeanne Bauer (runner up)
 Melisande Amos (third place)
 Mae Moreno (fourth place)
 Linda Borini (fifth place)
 Somere Sanders (sixth place)
 Viviana Londono (seventh place)

Male
 Sean Carrigan (winner)
 Jared Elliott (second place)
 John Keyser (third place)
 Mark Nilsson (fourth place)
 Harold "House" Moore (fifth place)
 Greg Cirulnick (sixth place)
 Santino Sloan (seventh place)

Production
The episodes of the show are filmed in U.S. cities such as Atlanta, Georgia Dallas, Texas, Miami, Florida, Minneapolis, Minnesota, Los Angeles, California and New York City.

Episode status
Reruns of the show was aired on the Game Show Network (GSN) in 2004.

, the show is made available for streaming online on the Fox Corporation-owned AVOD service Tubi.

References

External links
 
 

2004 American television series debuts
2004 American television series endings
2000s American reality television series
English-language television shows
Game Show Network original programming
NBC original programming
Television series by GRB Entertainment
Television series by Universal Television
Television series by Warner Bros. Television Studios